John Bravyak (born September 10, 1959) is a former professional American football defensive end in the National Football League. He attended the Temple University and played with the Buffalo Bills in 1987.

External links
Pro-Football Reference

1959 births
Living people
People from Sayre, Pennsylvania
Players of American football from Pennsylvania
Buffalo Bills players
Temple Owls football players